A constitutional referendum was held in Equatorial Guinea on 16 November 1991. The new constitution would replace the one-party state with multi-party politics. It was approved by 98.4% of voters with a 94.3% turnout.

Results

References

1991 referendums
Referendums in Equatorial Guinea
1991 in Equatorial Guinea
Constitutional referendums in Equatorial Guinea